The Taabo Dam is a hydroelectric power plant of the Bandama River in Côte d'Ivoire. This dam is located downstream from Kossou Dam. This is an "earth and rockfill dam with clay core 8100 m long and 43 m high." It has "five openings giving a maximum discharge capacity of 3,900 m3/sec through radial gates 11 x 11 m" with concrete spillway on the left bank that has a crest level of 113 m above sea level.

References

Hydroelectric power stations in Ivory Coast
Dams in Ivory Coast
Buildings and structures in Lagunes District
Agnéby-Tiassa